

The Cox-Klemin TW-2 was a 1920s American biplane training aircraft built by the Cox-Klemin Aircraft Corporation. It was powered by a water-cooled Hispano-Suiza 8 V8 aero-engine.

Development
The CK-2 was a biplane with single-bay biplane that utilized a Fokker scheme of N-shaped interplane struts and metal cabane. Three aircraft were built, two flight articles that were used to test different engines and one static test article. However, the TW-2 was not ordered into production.

Operators

United States Army Air Service

Specifications

See also

References

 Andrade, John. U.S. Military Aircraft Designations and Serials since 1909. Midland Counties Publications, 1979; page 171. .

Cox-Klemin TW-02
TW-2
Biplanes
Single-engined tractor aircraft